The Mercedes-Benz Arena (Shanghainese: Me-se-teq-sy-pen-zy Ven-ho Tson-sin, literally "Mercedes-Benz Culture Center"), formerly known as the Shanghai World Expo Cultural Center, is an indoor arena located on the former grounds of Expo 2010 in Pudong, Shanghai. It is owned and operated by the AEG-OPG joint venture.

The facility seats 18,000 people and includes a smaller venue, The Mixing Room & Muse, which is a more intimate live-music venue.

The arena hosted the opening ceremony for the Expo 2010, during which it was known as the Expo Cultural Center.

Naming rights
The arena is sponsored in a ten-year deal by Mercedes-Benz and was officially renamed the Mercedes-Benz Arena on January 15, 2011.

Events
The arena has become the most popular arena in mainland China since it opened in 2010.

Music
It is one of the most popular arenas for concert tours of the performers in Mandarin and Cantonese, also in Korean and Japanese.

Additionally, it attracted many superstars such as Adam Lambert, Akon, Alicia Keys, André Rieu, Andrea Bocelli, Aretha Franklin, Ariana Grande, Avenged Sevenfold, Avril Lavigne, The Beach Boys, Bruno Mars, Charlie Puth, The Cardigans, Eagles, Ed Sheeran, Elton John, Fall Out Boy, Imagine Dragons, Iron Maiden, James Blunt, Jane Zhang, Jennifer Lopez, Jessie J, Justin Bieber, Shawn Mendes, Katy Perry, The Killers, Lay Zhang, Lindsey Stirling, Lionel Richie, Mariah Carey, Maroon 5, Metallica, Michael Bublé, Muse, Nile Rodgers, Nine Percent, Nogizaka46, Owl City, OneRepublic, Pitbull, Richard Clayderman, Quincy Jones, Queen, Rebecca Ferguson, Rocket Girls 101, The Rolling Stones, Samantha Jade, Simple Plan, Slash, Taylor Swift, Tony Bennett, Troye Sivan, Usher, Unine and Kenshi Yonezu.

Sports
On 21 September 2017, an NHL pre-season game was held in the stadium, with the Vancouver Canucks losing to the LA Kings 5–2. The game saw a crowd of 10,088 gather to watch the NHL's first ever game played in China. In March 2016, the arena held a professional Dota 2 video game tournament, known as the Shanghai Major 2016. The International 2019, Dota 2 premier annual tournament, also took place in the arena in August 2019.

Entertainment
The Mercedes-Benz Arena held the annual Victoria's Secret Fashion Show in November 2017.

See also
List of indoor arenas in China

References

External links

 Mercedes-Benz Arena official homepage
 Mercedes-Benz Arena AEG homepage

Mercedes-Benz
Indoor arenas in China
Sports venues in Shanghai
Expo 2010
World's fair architecture in China
2010 establishments in China
Music venues completed in 2010
Performing arts venues in Shanghai
Cultural centers in China
Pudong